The following is a list of films released in Japan in 1993 (see 1993 in film).

See also 
 1993 in Japan
 1993 in Japanese television

References

External links
 Japanese films of 1993 at the Internet Movie Database

1993
Japanese
Films